The Mercator projection is a cylindrical map projection presented by Flemish geographer and cartographer Gerardus Mercator in 1569. It became the standard map projection for navigation because it is unique in representing north as up and south as down everywhere while preserving local directions and shapes. The map is thereby conformal. As a side effect, the Mercator projection inflates the size of objects away from the equator. This inflation is very small near the equator but accelerates with increasing latitude to become infinite at the poles. As a result, landmasses such as Greenland, Antarctica, Canada and Russia appear far larger than they actually are relative to landmasses near the equator, such as Central Africa.

History 
There is some controversy over the origins of the Mercator. German polymath Erhard Etzlaub engraved miniature "compass maps" (about 10×8 cm) of Europe and parts of Africa that spanned latitudes 0°–67° to allow adjustment of his portable pocket-size sundials. The projection found on these maps, dating to 1511, was stated by John Snyder in 1987 to be the same projection as Mercator's. However, given the geometry of a sundial, these maps may well have been based on the similar central cylindrical projection, a limiting case of the gnomonic projection, which is the basis for a sundial. Snyder amended his assessment to "a similar projection" in 1993.

Joseph Needham, a historian of China, wrote that the Chinese developed the Mercator projection hundreds of years before Mercator did, using it in star charts during the Song Dynasty. However, this was a simple, and common, case of misidentification. The projection in use was the equirectangular projection.

Portuguese mathematician and cosmographer Pedro Nunes first described the mathematical principle of the loxodrome and its use in marine navigation. In 1537, he proposed constructing a nautical atlas composed of several large-scale sheets in the cylindrical equidistant projection as a way to minimize distortion of directions. If these sheets were brought to the same scale and assembled, they would approximate the Mercator projection.

Mercator titled the map : "A new and augmented description of Earth corrected for the use of sailors". This title, along with an elaborate explanation for using the projection that appears as a section of text on the map, shows that Mercator understood exactly what he had achieved and that he intended the projection to aid navigation. Mercator never explained the method of construction or how he arrived at it. Various hypotheses have been tendered over the years, but in any case Mercator's friendship with Pedro Nunes and his access to the loxodromic tables Nunes created likely aided his efforts.

English mathematician Edward Wright published the first accurate tables for constructing the projection in 1599 and, in more detail, in 1610, calling his treatise "Certaine Errors in Navigation". The first mathematical formulation was publicized around 1645 by a mathematician named Henry Bond (c. 1600–1678). However, the mathematics involved were developed but never published by mathematician Thomas Harriot starting around 1589.

The development of the Mercator projection represented a major breakthrough in the nautical cartography of the 16th century. However, it was much ahead of its time, since the old navigational and surveying techniques were not compatible with its use in navigation. Two main problems prevented its immediate application: the impossibility of determining the longitude at sea with adequate accuracy and the fact that magnetic directions, instead of geographical directions, were used in navigation. Only in the middle of the 18th century, after the marine chronometer was invented and the spatial distribution of magnetic declination was known, could the Mercator projection be fully adopted by navigators.

Despite those position-finding limitations, the Mercator projection can be found in many world maps in the centuries following Mercator's first publication. However, it did not begin to dominate world maps until the 19th century, when the problem of position determination had been largely solved. Once the Mercator became the usual projection for commercial and educational maps, it came under persistent criticism from cartographers for its unbalanced representation of landmasses and its inability to usefully show the polar regions.

The criticisms leveled against inappropriate use of the Mercator projection resulted in a flurry of new inventions in the late 19th and early 20th century, often directly touted as alternatives to the Mercator. Due to these pressures, publishers gradually reduced their use of the projection over the course of the 20th century. However, the advent of Web mapping gave the projection an abrupt resurgence in the form of the Web Mercator projection.

Today, the Mercator can be found in marine charts, occasional world maps, and Web mapping services, but commercial atlases have largely abandoned it, and wall maps of the world can be found in many alternative projections. Google Maps, which relied on it since 2005, still uses it for local-area maps but dropped the projection from desktop platforms in 2017 for maps that are zoomed out of local areas. Many other online mapping services still exclusively use the Web Mercator.

Properties 

As in all cylindrical projections, parallels and meridians on the Mercator are straight and perpendicular to each other. In accomplishing this, the unavoidable east–west stretching of the map, which increases as distance away from the equator increases, is accompanied in the Mercator projection by a corresponding north–south stretching, so that at every point location the east–west scale is the same as the north–south scale, making it a conformal map projection. Conformal projections preserve angles around all locations.

Because the linear scale of a Mercator map increases with latitude, it distorts the size of geographical objects far from the equator and conveys a distorted perception of the overall geometry of the planet. At latitudes greater than 70° north or south the Mercator projection is practically unusable, because the linear scale becomes infinitely large at the poles. A Mercator map can therefore never fully show the polar areas (as long as the projection is based on a cylinder centered on the Earth's rotation axis; see the transverse Mercator projection for another application).

The Mercator projection maps all lines with constant bearing (rhumbs (mathematically known as loxodromes—those making constant angles with the meridians) to straight lines. The two properties, conformality and straight rhumb lines, make this projection uniquely suited to marine navigation: courses and bearings are measured using wind roses or protractors, and the corresponding directions are easily transferred from point to point, on the map, with the help of a parallel ruler (for example).

The Mercator projection is often compared to and confused with the central cylindrical projection, which is the result of projecting points from the sphere onto a tangent cylinder along straight radial lines, as if from a light source placed at the Earth's center. Both have extreme distortion far from the equator and cannot show the poles. However, they are different projections and have different properties.

Distortion of sizes 

As on all map projections, shapes or sizes are distortions of the true layout of the Earth's surface. 

The Mercator projection exaggerates areas far from the equator.

Examples of size distortion

 Greenland appears the same size as Africa, when in reality Africa's area is 14 times as large. 
 Greenland's real area is comparable to the Democratic Republic of the Congo's alone. 
 Africa appears to be roughly the same size as South America, when in reality Africa is over one and a half times as large.

 Alaska appears to be the same size as Australia, although Australia is actually 4.5 times as large.
 Alaska also takes as much area on the map as Brazil, whereas Brazil's area is nearly 5 times that of Alaska.

 Madagascar and Great Britain look about the same size, while Madagascar is actually more than twice as large as Great Britain.

Criticism
Because of great land area distortions, some consider the projection unsuitable for general world maps. Mercator himself used the equal-area sinusoidal projection to show relative areas. However, despite such distortions, the Mercator projection was, especially in the late 19th and early 20th centuries, perhaps the most common projection used in world maps, despite being much criticized for this use.

Because of its very common usage, the Mercator projection has been supposed to have influenced people's view of the world, and because it shows countries near the Equator as too small when compared to those of Europe and North America, it has been supposed to cause people to consider those countries as less important. As a result of these criticisms, modern atlases no longer use the Mercator projection for world maps or for areas distant from the equator, preferring other cylindrical projections, or forms of equal-area projection. The Mercator projection is, however, still commonly used for areas near the equator where distortion is minimal. It is also frequently found in maps of time zones.

Arno Peters stirred controversy beginning in 1972 when he proposed what is now usually called the Gall–Peters projection to remedy the problems of the Mercator, claiming it to be his own original work without referencing prior work by cartographers such as Gall's work from 1855. The projection he promoted is a specific parameterization of the cylindrical equal-area projection. In response, a 1989 resolution by seven North American geographical groups disparaged using cylindrical projections for general-purpose world maps, which would include both the Mercator and the Gall–Peters.

Uses 
Practically every marine chart in print is based on the Mercator projection due to its uniquely favorable properties for navigation. It is also commonly used by street map services hosted on the Internet, due to its uniquely favorable properties for local-area maps computed on demand. Mercator projections were also important in the mathematical development of plate tectonics in the 1960s.

Marine navigation

The Mercator projection was designed for use in marine navigation because of its unique property of representing any course of constant bearing as a straight segment. Such a course, known as a rhumb (or, mathematically, a loxodrome) is preferred in marine navigation because ships can sail in a constant compass direction, reducing the difficult, error-prone course corrections that otherwise would be needed frequently when sailing a different course.  For distances small compared to the radius of the Earth, the difference between the rhumb and the technically shortest course, a great circle segment, is negligible, and even for longer distances, the simplicity of the constant bearing makes it attractive.   As observed by Mercator, on such a course, the ship would not arrive by the shortest route, but it will surely arrive. Sailing a rhumb meant that all that the sailors had to do was keep a constant course as long as they knew where they were when they started, where they intended to be when they finished, and had a map in Mercator projection that correctly showed those two coordinates.

Web Mercator 

Many major online street mapping services (Bing Maps, Google Maps, Mapbox, MapQuest, OpenStreetMap, Yahoo! Maps, and others) use a variant of the Mercator projection for their map images called Web Mercator or Google Web Mercator. Despite its obvious scale variation at small scales, the projection is well-suited as an interactive world map that can be zoomed seamlessly to large-scale (local) maps, where there is relatively little distortion due to the variant projection's near-conformality.

The major online street mapping services' tiling systems display most of the world at the lowest zoom level as a single square image, excluding the polar regions by truncation at latitudes of φmax = ±85.05113°. (See below.) Latitude values outside this range are mapped using a different relationship that does not diverge at φ = ±90°.

Mathematics

Cylindrical projections 
Although the surface of Earth is best modelled by an oblate ellipsoid of revolution, for small scale maps the ellipsoid is approximated by a sphere of radius a, where a is approximately 6,371 km. This spherical approximation of Earth can be modelled by a smaller sphere of radius R, called the globe in this section. The globe determines the scale of the map. The various cylindrical projections specify how the geographic detail is transferred from the globe to a cylinder tangential to it at the equator. The cylinder is then unrolled to give the planar map. The fraction  is called the representative fraction (RF) or the principal scale of the projection.

A cylindrical map projection is specified by formulae linking the geographic coordinates of latitude φ and longitude λ to Cartesian coordinates on the map with origin on the equator and x-axis along the equator. By construction, all points on the same meridian lie on the same generator of the cylinder at a constant value of x, but the distance y along the generator (measured from the equator) is an arbitrary function of latitude, y(φ). In general this function does not describe the geometrical projection (as of light rays onto a screen) from the centre of the globe to the cylinder, which is only one of an unlimited number of ways to conceptually project a cylindrical map.

Since the cylinder is tangential to the globe at the equator, the scale factor between globe and cylinder is unity on the equator but nowhere else. This scale factor on the parallel is conventionally denoted by k and the corresponding scale factor on the meridian is denoted by h.

Scale factor 

The Mercator projection is determined by the requirement that the projection be conformal.  One implication of this is the "isotropy of scale factors", which means that the point scale factor is independent of direction, so that small shapes are preserved by the projection.  This implies that the vertical scale factor, h, equals the horizontal scale factor, k.  Since k = , so must h.

The graph shows the variation of this scale factor with latitude. Some numerical values are listed below.
at latitude 30° the scale factor is   k = sec 30° = 1.15,
at latitude 45° the scale factor is   k = sec 45° = 1.41,
at latitude 60° the scale factor is   k = sec 60° = 2,
at latitude 80° the scale factor is   k = sec 80° = 5.76,
at latitude 85° the scale factor is   k = sec 85° = 11.5

The area scale factor is the product of the parallel and meridian scales . For Greenland, taking 73° as a median latitude, hk = 11.7. For Australia, taking 25° as a median latitude, hk = 1.2. For Great Britain, taking 55° as a median latitude, hk = 3.04.

The variation with latitude is sometimes indicated by multiple bar scales as shown below.

The classic way of showing the distortion inherent in a projection is to use Tissot's indicatrix. Nicolas Tissot noted that the scale factors at a point on a map projection, specified by the numbers h and k, define an ellipse at that point. For cylindrical projections, the axes of the ellipse are aligned to the meridians and parallels. For the Mercator projection, h = k, so the ellipses degenerate into circles with radius proportional to the value of the scale factor for that latitude. These circles are rendered on the projected map with extreme variation in size, indicative of Mercator's scale variations.

Mercator projection transformations

Derivation 

As discussed above, the isotropy condition implies that h = k = .  Consider a point on the globe of radius R with longitude λ and latitude φ.  If φ is increased by an infinitesimal amount, dφ, the point moves R dφ along a meridian of the globe of radius R, so the corresponding change in y, dy, must be hR dφ = R sec φ dφ. Therefore y′(φ) = R sec φ.  Similarly, increasing λ by dλ moves the point R cos φ dλ along a parallel of the globe, so dx = kR cos φ dλ = R dλ.  That is, x′(λ) = R. Integrating the equations

with x(λ0) = 0 and y(0) = 0, gives x(λ) and y(φ).  The value λ0 is the longitude of an arbitrary central meridian that is usually, but not always, that of Greenwich (i.e., zero). The angles λ and φ are expressed in radians. By the integral of the secant function,

The function y(φ) is plotted alongside φ for the case R = 1: it tends to infinity at the poles. The linear y-axis values are not usually shown on printed maps; instead some maps show the non-linear scale of latitude values on the right. More often than not the maps show only a graticule of selected meridians and parallels.

Inverse transformations 

The expression on the right of the second equation defines the Gudermannian function; i.e., φ = gd(): the direct equation may therefore be written as y = R·gd−1(φ).

Alternative expressions 
There are many alternative expressions for y(φ), all derived by elementary manipulations.

Corresponding inverses are:

For angles expressed in degrees:

The above formulae are written in terms of the globe radius R. It is often convenient to work directly with the map width W = 2R. For example, the basic transformation equations become

Truncation and aspect ratio 
The ordinate y of the Mercator projection becomes infinite at the poles and the map must be truncated at some latitude less than ninety degrees. This need not be done symmetrically. Mercator's original map is truncated at 80°N and 66°S with the result that European countries were moved toward the centre of the map. The aspect ratio of his map is  = 1.65. Even more extreme truncations have been used: a Finnish school atlas was truncated at approximately 76°N and 56°S, an aspect ratio of 1.97.

Much Web-based mapping uses a zoomable version of the Mercator projection with an aspect ratio of one. In this case the maximum latitude attained must correspond to y = ±, or equivalently  = . Any of the inverse transformation formulae may be used to calculate the corresponding latitudes:

Small element geometry 
The relations between y(φ) and properties of the projection, such as the transformation of angles and the variation in scale, follow from the geometry of corresponding small elements on the globe and map. The figure below shows a point P at latitude φ and longitude λ on the globe and a nearby point Q at latitude φ + δφ and longitude λ + δλ. The vertical lines PK and MQ are arcs of meridians of length Rδφ. The horizontal lines PM and KQ are arcs of parallels of length R(cos φ)δλ. The corresponding points on the projection define a rectangle of width δx and height δy.

For small elements, the angle PKQ is approximately a right angle and therefore

The previously mentioned scaling factors from globe to cylinder are given by
parallel scale factor     
meridian scale factor   

Since the meridians are mapped to lines of constant x, we must have  and δx = Rδλ, (λ in radians). Therefore, in the limit of infinitesimally small elements

In the case of the Mercator projection, y'''(φ) = R sec φ, so this gives us h = k and α = β.  The fact that h = k is the isotropy of scale factors discussed above.  The fact that α = β reflects another implication of the mapping being conformal, namely the fact that a sailing course of constant azimuth on the globe is mapped into the same constant grid bearing on the map.

 Formulae for distance 
Converting ruler distance on the Mercator map into true (great circle) distance on the sphere is straightforward along the equator but nowhere else. One problem is the variation of scale with latitude, and another is that straight lines on the map (rhumb lines), other than the meridians or the equator, do not correspond to great circles.

The distinction between rhumb (sailing) distance and great circle (true) distance was clearly understood by Mercator. (See Legend 12 on the 1569 map.) He stressed that the rhumb line distance is an acceptable approximation for true great circle distance for courses of short or moderate distance, particularly at lower latitudes. He even quantifies his statement: "When the great circle distances which are to be measured in the vicinity of the equator do not exceed 20 degrees of a great circle, or 15 degrees near Spain and France, or 8 and even 10 degrees in northern parts it is convenient to use rhumb line distances".

For a ruler measurement of a short line, with midpoint at latitude φ, where the scale factor is k = sec φ = :
True distance = rhumb distance ≅ ruler distance × cos φ / RF.   (short lines)

The corresponding distances for latitudes 20°, 40°, 60° and 80° are 846 km, 689 km, 450 km and 156 km respectively.

Longer distances require various approaches.

 On the equator 
Scale is unity on the equator (for a non-secant projection). Therefore, interpreting ruler measurements on the equator is simple:
True distance = ruler distance / RF     (equator)

For the above model, with RF = , 1 cm corresponds to 3,000 km.

 On other parallels 
On any other parallel the scale factor is sec φ so that
Parallel distance = ruler distance × cos φ / RF     (parallel).

For the above model 1 cm corresponds to 1,500 km at a latitude of 60°.

This is not the shortest distance between the chosen endpoints on the parallel because a parallel is not a great circle. The difference is small for short distances but increases as λ, the longitudinal separation, increases. For two points, A and B, separated by 10° of longitude on the parallel at 60° the distance along the parallel is approximately 0.5 km greater than the great circle distance. (The distance AB along the parallel is (a cos φ) λ. The length of the chord AB is 2(a cos φ) sin . This chord subtends an angle at the centre equal to 2arcsin(cos φ sin ) and the great circle distance between A and B is 2a arcsin(cos φ sin ).) In the extreme case where the longitudinal separation is 180°, the distance along the parallel is one half of the circumference of that parallel; i.e., 10,007.5 km. On the other hand, the geodesic between these points is a great circle arc through the pole subtending an angle of 60° at the center: the length of this arc is one sixth of the great circle circumference, about 6,672 km. The difference is 3,338 km so the ruler distance measured from the map is quite misleading even after correcting for the latitude variation of the scale factor.

 On a meridian 
A meridian of the map is a great circle on the globe but the continuous scale variation means ruler measurement alone cannot yield the true distance between distant points on the meridian. However, if the map is marked with an accurate and finely spaced latitude scale from which the latitude may be read directly—as is the case for the Mercator 1569 world map (sheets 3, 9, 15) and all subsequent nautical charts—the meridian distance between two latitudes φ1 and φ2 is simply

If the latitudes of the end points cannot be determined with confidence then they can be found instead by calculation on the ruler distance. Calling the ruler distances of the end points on the map meridian as measured from the equator y1 and y2, the true distance between these points on the sphere is given by using any one of the inverse Mercator formulæ:

where R may be calculated from the width W of the map by R = . For example, on a map with R = 1 the values of y = 0, 1, 2, 3 correspond to latitudes of φ = 0°, 50°, 75°, 84° and therefore the successive intervals of 1 cm on the map correspond to latitude intervals on the globe of 50°, 25°, 9° and distances of 5,560 km, 2,780 km, and 1,000 km on the Earth.

 On a rhumb 
A straight line on the Mercator map at angle α to the meridians is a rhumb line. When α =  or  the rhumb corresponds to one of the parallels; only one, the equator, is a great circle. When α = 0 or  it corresponds to a meridian great circle (if continued around the Earth). For all other values it is a spiral from pole to pole on the globe intersecting all meridians at the same angle, and is thus not a great circle. This section discusses only the last of these cases.

If α is neither 0 nor  then the above figure of the infinitesimal elements shows that the length of an infinitesimal rhumb line on the sphere between latitudes φ; and φ + δφ is a sec α δφ. Since α is constant on the rhumb this expression can be integrated to give, for finite rhumb lines on the Earth:

Once again, if Δφ may be read directly from an accurate latitude scale on the map, then the rhumb distance between map points with latitudes φ1 and φ2 is given by the above. If there is no such scale then the ruler distances between the end points and the equator, y1 and y2, give the result via an inverse formula:

These formulæ give rhumb distances on the sphere which may differ greatly from true distances whose determination requires more sophisticated calculations.

 Generalization to the ellipsoid 
When the Earth is modelled by a spheroid (ellipsoid of revolution) the Mercator projection must be modified if it is to remain conformal. The transformation equations and scale factor for the non-secant version are

The scale factor is unity on the equator, as it must be since the cylinder is tangential to the ellipsoid at the equator. The ellipsoidal correction of the scale factor increases with latitude but it is never greater than e2, a correction of less than 1%. (The value of e''2 is about 0.006 for all reference ellipsoids.) This is much smaller than the scale inaccuracy, except very close to the equator. Only accurate Mercator projections of regions near the equator will necessitate the ellipsoidal corrections.

The inverse is solved iteratively, as the isometric latitude is involved.

See also 

Cartography
Central cylindrical projection – more distorted; sometimes erroneously described as the method of construction of the Mercator projection
Conformal map projection
Equirectangular projection – less distorted, but not equal-area
Gall–Peters projection – an equal-area cylindrical projection
Jordan Transverse Mercator
List of map projections
Mercator 1569 world map
Nautical chart
Omission of New Zealand from maps – often believed to be caused by the Mercator projection
Rhumbline network
Tissot's indicatrix
Transverse Mercator projection
Universal Transverse Mercator coordinate system

Notes

References

Bibliography
.

 (Supplements: Maxima files and Latex code and figures)

 This paper can be downloaded from USGS pages. It gives full details of most projections, together with interesting introductory sections, but it does not derive any of the projections from first principles.

Further reading

External links 

Ad maiorem Gerardi Mercatoris gloriam – contains high-resolution images of the 1569 world map by Mercator.
Table of examples and properties of all common projections, from radicalcartography.net.
An interactive Java Applet to study the metric deformations of the Mercator Projection.
Web Mercator: Non-Conformal, Non-Mercator (Noel Zinn, Hydrometronics LLC)
Mercator's Projection at University of British Columbia
Google Maps Coordinates

Conformal projections
Map projections
16th-century inventions
Early modern Netherlandish cartography
Cylindrical projections